Aq Bolagh-e Mohammad Vali (also Romanized as Āq Bolāgh-e Moḩammad Valī) is a village in Japelaq-e Gharbi Rural District, Japelaq District, Azna County, Lorestan Province, Iran. At the 2006 census, its population was 102, in 22 families.

References 

Towns and villages in Azna County